Qayalı is a village and municipality in the Barda Rayon of Azerbaijan. It has a population of 333.

References

Populated places in Barda District